Arturo Merino Benítez (April 17, 1888 in Chillán, Ñuble Province – May 2, 1970 in Santiago), was an aviator with rank of Commodore, and the founder of both the Chilean Air Force (1930) and LAN Chile (1929) the national airline. Chile's largest airport was named in his honour, Arturo Merino Benítez International Airport. His parents were Pedro Merino Feliú and Clorinda Benítez Labbé. He died from a stroke at age 82, his remains are at the Cementerio General de Santiago.

Bibliography

Biografía ICARITO ICARITO biography
Fundación Arturo Merino B. Arturo Merino B. Foundation

1888 births
1970 deaths
People from Chillán
Chilean aviators
Aviation pioneers